Pirate radio stations have operated in various countries of Asia, often putting over political or nationalist points of view. Offshore stations have attempted to reach China or overseas Chinese residents. Citizens' Radio is an unlicensed Hong Kong pro-democracy station. In Taiwan, what are known as "underground radio" stations have broadcast both pro- and anti-government opinions. Large numbers of unlicensed stations have functioned in the Philippines, of which 107.9 U-Radio (2006–2013) is among the best known. Finally, Radio First Termer was briefly operated by and for U.S. troops in Vietnam in 1971.

Vietnam
Radio First Termer was a pirate radio station which operated in January 1971 in Saigon during the Vietnam War.

The station was hosted by a United States Air Force sergeant (born August 15, 1948) calling himself "Dave Rabbit". The two other members of the crew were known as "Pete Sadler" and "Nguyen". Their real names were Don Wade and Roma, a WLS team.

After three tours in Vietnam, "Dave Rabbit" and his friends launched Radio First Termer from a secret studio in a Saigon brothel. The station broadcast for 63 hours over 21 nights (between 1 January 1971 and 21 January 1971).

The station played "hard acid rock" such as Steppenwolf, Bloodrock, Three Dog Night, Led Zeppelin, Sugarloaf, the James Gang, and Iron Butterfly, bands which were popular among the troops but largely ignored by the American Forces Vietnam Network.  The music was mixed with antiwar commentary, skits poking fun at the U.S. Air Force and Lyndon B. Johnson, and raunchy sex and drug oriented jokes.

During the mid-1990s, sound clips from a Radio First Termer broadcast posted on the internet renewed interest in the station.  In February 2006, "Dave Rabbit" came forward and told his story.  He also did an interview for a bonus feature on the DVD release of Sir! No Sir!, a film about G.I. counterculture during the Vietnam era.

Although the frequency was always announced as FM69, in reality, the show was broadcast over numerous frequencies, in addition to 69 MHz as selected by the Radio Relay troops across Vietnam. It was also broadcast over AM frequencies, including 690 AM.

In February 2008 audio clips of this underground radio show made their way into the hands Opie & Anthony and 3rd mic Jim Norton. They played some of the audio of these shows over the air at both their terrestrial radio show and their XM Satellite radio show and were impressed with the skills of Dave Rabbit back in "the 'Nam" which led to renewed interest on such sites as Google.

China
A number of offshore radio stations have reportedly operated from the South China Sea, mainly for political purposes and these include Voice of the People's Liberation Army; Radio Flash; The October Storm; Rediffusion Central; Popular of Peking. In 1990–1991, two other offshore radio stations intended for a Chinese audience made news in the world's press.

One of them was Radio Tiananmen, a station that was to be based aboard the MV Sarah (Lichfield I) to be renamed Liberty that had been the former home of Radio Newyork International that broadcast briefly during two consecutive years in late 1980s from an anchorage off Jones Beach, New York. The idea was to anchor the ship in international waters off the Northeast coastline of the US and to broadcast on behalf of the thousands of Chinese students studying in the US in support of their fellow students who had demonstrated in Tiananmen Square. The idea faltered when the backers were told that the United States government would oppose an independent political station of this type.

The group called themselves "Federation for Democracy in China" and they bought a ship, which they renamed, Goddess of Democracy, which was also the name of the proposed station. When the vessel sailed from La Rochelle, France it was intended for the ship to dock and that is where studios, transmitters and radio antenna would be installed. However, the project was abandoned after political and financial problems.

Hong Kong
In 2006, Citizens' Radio was founded by a group of pro-democracy activists, including Tsang Kin-shing and legislator Leung Kwok-hung, also known as "Long Hair". It broadcast on weeknights from Chai Wan on 102.8 MHz FM.

On 30 November 2009, FM101, a station based in Kwun Tong commenced broadcasting, according to the South China Morning Post (1 December 2009). It was heard in the east of Kowloon and the east of Hong Kong Island. The station's founders include Leung King-wai, Tsang Chun-Ying and Kwok Yiu-Cheong. The latter two were formerly presenters for Citizens' Radio, but Citizens' Radio was not involved in its foundation, according to founder Tsang Kin-Shing.

Taiwan
In reference to unlicensed land-based stations, the term underground radio is in common usage in Taiwan.  The World United Formosans for Independence reportedly studied the possibility of broadcasting from the Philippines, but no concrete action materialised.

The underground radio movement began in the liberalising political milieu following the lifting of the decades-long martial law.  Historically most of the stations have opposed, in some manner, the political establishment represented by the Chinese Nationalist Party (Kuomintang) and the Republic of China (ROC) framework, in favour of the then opposition movement broadly consisting of the Democratic Progressive Party (DPP) and allied social movements.  These so-called pan-green radio stations are mostly based in central and southern Taiwan with most listeners being hard-core pan-green supporters who despise Kuomintang rule and the potential for reunification with China. A few stations positioned themselves on the opposing end of the political spectrum, generally favouring the ROC status quo advocated by the New Party and "non-mainstream factions" within the Nationalist Party. With the DPP formerly in power, and ultimate Taiwan independence and sovereignty is the stance taken by most underground radio stations, Taiwan was one of the rare examples in the world of underground radio stations being pro-government.

Programming generally is of a vertical blocking format, with live call-ins taking up a good portion of air time. On some stations, slots are allocated to local community and activist groups.  The most prominent segment of the audience comes from rural working class, males usually middle-aged and beyond. Taiwanese Hokkien is by far the most commonly used language on the air, although Mandarin and, much less frequently, Hakka are also used. Underground radio stations cover their expenses by selling unorthodox drugs or medicine in a humorous and entertaining manner to keep the listeners hooked between actual programming.

Most if not all underground stations favour a mechanism to gain legal status but many balk at the costly requirements, which they believe to favour corporate and Nationalist-owned broadcasters. Government policy has always treated underground radio as an illegal enterprise, even after the DPP came to power. Official responses have been more varied, alternating between levying fines and confiscating equipment to tolerating their presence. Most stations are able to set up backup broadcast points within days of government raids.  Commercial stations are known to file official complaints against pirate stations, whose signals are said to interfere with legal broadcasts.

Philippines
Licensed radio operations in the country are supervised by the National Telecommunications Commission and the same (along with the Kapisanan ng mga Brodkaster ng Pilipinas) has been involved in raids cracking down unlicensed stations. Despite the proliferation of pirate radio in various times and the agency's proper counteractions, the most documented notorious hub of unlicensed operators have been predominantly within Metro Manila while others are from Cebu and in some parts of Mindanao.

2006-2013: 107.9 U-Radio
The most known unregulated radio station was 107.9 U-Radio. It began its broadcast in 2006, succeeding Power 108 FM, that shut down on August 31, 2004, on claims that the former station was a pirate. The station started broadcasting in Metro Manila at 107.9 MHz with the power of 100 watts, playing non-stop dance music, with no call sign and disc jockeys, and a stinger of a recorded female voiceover mentioning a mobile phone number that served as a request line in between queues. With hundreds of text messages being received daily, the station was a hot topic at dozens of blogs and forums over the internet.

In April 2007 they temporarily ceased transmission so they could obtain all the necessary broadcast permits from the National Telecommunications Commission to legitimize the station. In June 2007, U Radio returned on air under the temporary license of a community-based radio station and started broadcasting with the power of 500 watts.

Recently, on April 20, 2013, 107.9 U-Radio ceased its operation, due to the claims of the Professional Regulations Commission and the National Telecommunications Commission that it was a pirate station, and its expired license. However, it continues its broadcast online.

2015-present: Post-107.9 U-Radio

98.3 Radyo Kontra Droga
The Filipino hip-hop and rap formatted station was founded in late 2015 by two-way radio dealer and proprietor Ron Flores Cruz at a Paco, Manila studio in time for then-candidate for President Rodrigo Duterte's campaign, initially as a limited-time nightly operation that later expanded to as much as 18 hours daily. At the onset of operations, the station positioned itself first on 88.7 FM before moving to what was formerly occupied legitimately by the Polytechnic University of the Philippines' campus radio until it went on hiatus in November 2008. Its 50-watt signal covers parts of the immediate Manila area.

Listeners contended that the station was pirate due to the then-perceived absence of an immediate public concern over a massive crackdown on illegal drugs.

In July 2018, the Polytechnic University of the Philippines resumed test broadcasts on the same frequency until recommencing full-time services by September, forming a currently unresolved broadcasting conflict. Owing to the proximity of both Paco and Santa Mesa, Manila where the campus station is located, both have significantly interfered with each other.

In October 2018, the station temporarily went off the air to accommodate Cruz's campaign for a seat in the Manila City Council representing the city's 5th district in the midterm elections, but lost. The station resumed operations in November 2019, competing with both DZMC and another pirate station on the frequency.

DHub Online Radio
The station was first detected by authorities in mid-2019. The firm is reportedly operated by a Malolos, Bulacan-based herbal medicine group but was reportedly transmitting from atop a condominium in the vicinity of SM North EDSA. According to intelligence reports it had utilized two frequencies, but mostly transmitted on 98.3 FM.

On February 14, 2020 the station moved to 87.9 FM, a frequency legitimately assigned to, and operated by Ateneo de Manila University's Radyo Katipunan, causing both stations to significantly jam each other. It lasted for three weeks before moving back to 98.3 FM. So far, no punitive actions against the station from the NTC have been undertaken yet, adding up to the still-unresolved conflict between the Polytechnic University's DZMC and Radyo Kontra Droga.

Radyo Kontra Weeaboo
The multiplexed pirate network of stations are heavily J-pop formatted outlets claiming as "edgy radio stations" in the whole of Metro Manila that target listeners are anime lovers especially cosplayers. The whole venture was started on May 31, 2017, playing J-pop, anime and tokusatsu soundtracks and a series of Morse codes reading "RKW". It is reportedly run by a group led by an amateur radio operator. 
The stations are respectively broadcasting on 107.1 FM as RKW-1 Southern Metro Manila and 89.5 FM as RKW-2 Northern Metro Manila, housed in Pasay and Quezon City while maintaining the main studio located in Cavite City. The outlet later started simulcasting online.

Prior to commencement of operations, the 89.5 FM spot was last legally operated as DLSU's Green Giant FM upon its launch in 2008 until the station migrated exclusively online. Since 2013, the frequency, however, has a presence in southern Metro Manila through Santo Tomas, Batangas-based Apollo Broadcast Investors O&O DWEG 89.5. The 107.1 spot had previously been a dormant position since 2010, lastly occupied by Z-107 (DWYZ), a low-power hip-hop formatted station that ceased operations after failing to secure a renewed permit from the NTC.

Complaints about the stations have been levelled due to its expletive-riddled and copyright infringed station ID  that is using an altered version of Super Radyo DZBB 594's 2017 jingle. The stations have reportedly been illegally reusing callsigns, the first being DZTT at 89.5 (pronounced D-Z-double-T, a parody of the DZBB-AM calls and also a play on the Filipino word for the male genitalia) and DWBU at 107.1. The latter calls, however are legally held by the Bicol University campus radio. Furthermore, the stations have earned the ire of a non-profit group composed of broadcasters and radio enthusiasts.

So far, no documented actions by the National Telecommunications Commission against the stations have been released.

2017-2018: Pathway Radio Cebu
Another low-powered pirate station based in Cebu, Pathway Radio 100.7, started its operation around January 2017. Pathway Radio is a religious station operated at a very low power of 100 watts. The station has been a member of Community Broadcasters Association of the Philippines (CBAP), an organization that consists of other community broadcasters across the Philippines and has no affiliation to the KBP. Recently, in July 2018, Pathway Radio 100.7 ceased its broadcasting, due to technical difficulties and that it was a pirate radio station because the broadcast permits was not renewed from the National Telecommunications Commission, as well as frequency spacing regulations.

Mindanao
In a report by Sun.Star, there were 30 identified illegal radio stations that were allegedly operated within the Davao Region, including one owned by a Congressman. The NTC-XI issued a cease and desist order for 26 stations while issued a show-cause order for 4.

External links
Dave Rabbit's Official Podcast Home Page
List of songs in the only known copy of an episode
Radio First Termer home page with audio samples and Dave Rabbit interview
Vietnam War Pirate DJ Dave Rabbit Has Finally Come Forward

References

Asia
Vietnam War and the media